Joseph Louis Benz (January 21, 1886 – April 22, 1957) was an American pitcher in Major League Baseball from 1911 to 1919. He played for the Chicago White Sox. Benz's two main pitches were the spitball and the knuckleball.

Benz pitched a no-hitter for the White Sox on May 13, 1914, against the Cleveland Naps. He was a member of the Sox teams that reached the World Series in both 1917 and 1919, but appeared in neither. Benz had a 7–3 record during the 1917 season and was 8-8 a year later, throwing 10 complete games. But he pitched in just one game during the 1919 season, and was not on the roster for the 1919 World Series, which was tainted by the Black Sox Scandal.

The Benz family was of German Catholic descent, Joe's grandfather having emigrated from the Grand Duchy of Baden in 1849.

After baseball, Benz was the custodian of a church and also worked for O'Hare Field. He died of a heart-related illness in 1957.

References

External links

Joe Benz at SABR (Baseball BiogProject)

1886 births
1957 deaths
American people of German descent
Baseball players from Indiana
Chicago White Sox players
Des Moines Boosters players
Green Bay Bays players
Major League Baseball pitchers
Newark Newks players
People from Dearborn County, Indiana